The Crosby Arboretum is located in Picayune, Mississippi, United States, and is affiliated with Mississippi State University. It contains 64 acres (259,000 m2) in its interpretive center, plus over 700 acres (2.8 km2) in seven additional natural areas, sheltering over 300 species of indigenous trees and shrubs.

History and landscape 
The Arboretum  project  was  initiated  by  Lynn Crosby Gammill and her husband Stewart Gammill along with  her brother Osmond Crosby  to honor their father,  L. O. Crosby, Jr. (1907–1978), by conserving the region's biological diversity and showcasing plants native to the Pearl River drainage basin. The seven natural areas in Pearl River, Hancock, and Lamar counties were selected for diversity of vegetation, and are preserved and managed for research. These areas contain longleaf pine forests, slash pine hardwoods, sweet bay-tupelo-swamp bay, beech-magnolia, bald cypress-tupelo, bottomland hardwoods, hillside bogs, and savannas.

Hillside Bog – 70 acres (283,000 m²) of highly diverse habitat in northern Hancock County, including a hillside bog, longleaf pine, sweetbay-tupelo-swampbay, and longleaf pine-scrub oak.
 Dead Tiger Creek Hammock – 20 acres (81,000 m²) of a low, non-alluvial, hardwood swamp, home to a variety of species including Coreopsis nudata and Macranthera flammea.
 Dead Tiger Creek Savanna – 20 acres (81,000 m²) including a pine ridge, sloping bog area with several pitcher plant bogs that contain orchids and insect eating plants, and a flat savanna, containing most of the Mississippi holly species and 2 species of pitcher plant.
 Red Bluff – 320 acres (1.3 km²) along Catahoula Creek, with a clear-water stream, sandy white beaches, oxbow lakes, titi-lined creek banks, open sandy areas, gum swamps, and dry pine woods.
 Talowah – 120 acres (486,000 m²) of longleaf pine ridges, maintained by periodic burning, with hardwoods along the branch bottoms.
 Mill Creek – 20 acres (81,000 m²) of mature beech-magnolia woodland. All five species of magnolia in the state are found here, as are beech, southern magnolia, swampbay, spruce pine, and yellow-poplar.
 Steep Hollow – A diverse and species-rich area with quaking bogs, longleaf pine slopes and ridges, and sweetbay-tupelo-swampbay areas.

Pinecote Pavilion 
The Arboretum is home to the Pinecote Pavilion designed by the late E. Fay Jones. Jones was an apprentice to Frank Lloyd Wright and followed many of Wright's design principles. The pavilion is one of the architectural jewels of Mississippi. 

In 1991, Pinecote Pavilion has received an Honor award from the American Institute of Architects and secured Jones to win the AIA Gold Medal. Pinecote, the 64-acre Interpretive Center, was sensitively designed by consultants Andropogon Associates and site master planner Edward L. Blake, Jr. The design for Pinecote received a 1991 Honor award from the American Society of Landscape Architects (ASLA) and an ASLA Medallion Award (1999). Pinecote features walking journeys through 20 acres of biologically-enhanced savanna exhibits, 40 acres of woodland succession, and nearly 4 acres of created waterways.

See also 
 List of botanical gardens in the United States

External links

References 

Arboreta in Mississippi
Botanical gardens in Mississippi
Protected areas of Pearl River County, Mississippi
Mississippi State University
Nature reserves in Mississippi